Daniel Siebert (born 4 May 1984) is a German football referee who is based in Berlin. He referees for FC Nordost Berlin of the Berlin Football Association. He is a FIFA referee, and is ranked as a UEFA elite category referee.

Refereeing career
Siebert, referee of the club FC Nordost Berlin, has been officiating since 1998. In 2007, he was appointed as a DFB referee. Siebert made his premiere in the 2. Bundesliga in 2009. He was appointed as a Bundesliga referee for the 2012–13 season, and made his first top-flight appearance in the match between Schalke 04 and FC Augsburg on 1 September 2012, issuing three yellow cards.

On 24 October 2014, it was announced Siebert would replace Wolfgang Stark as a FIFA referee in 2015. This made Siebert the youngest of the ten German FIFA referees.

Siebert made his international debut on 29 May 2015 when he officiated the 2015 UEFA European Under-19 Championship qualification match between Portugal and Turkey. The first senior international match Siebert officiated was a friendly match between Luxembourg and Moldova on 9 June 2015.

Siebert has officiated 3 matches during the 2020 European Championship. He oversaw the Group D Scotland–Czech Republic fixture, the Group E Sweden–Slovakia match, and the Round of 16 game between Wales and Denmark.

He whistled 4 matches of the 2021 FIFA Arab Cup such as the final match between Tunisia and Algeria.

Personal life
Siebert was born in Berlin, where he still lives. He works as a teacher part-time at a sports school in Berlin.

References

External links
 Profile at dfb.de 
 Profile at worldfootball.net

1984 births
Living people
German football referees
UEFA Champions League referees
Sportspeople from Berlin
UEFA Euro 2020 referees
2022 FIFA World Cup referees
FIFA World Cup referees